Mount Ahır is a mountain located in Kahramanmaraş Province, southern Turkey, rising up to  .

Geography
Mount Ahir is a flat-shaped mountain mass extending in the east-west direction on the Southeastern Taurus Mountains. It surrounds Kahramanmaraş in the north and northwest directions. It is bordered in the west by Ceyhan River.

Geology and hydrology 
It was formed by bending as a result of tectonic movemnets. The mountain consists of largely limestone. Rain and melting snow waters penetrating into the porous structure of the limestone emerge as springs at the mountain foot, which are used as drinking water resource for the city of Kahramanmaraş. Shallow lakes are found at the plains in the high parts of the mountain. The "Karagöl" at  elevation is the largest of them.

Flora and fauna
Although deteriorated by human, the mountain's nature has still a rich vegetation. The richness in plant species diversity as a result of being a transition area of the Mediterranean Region to the Irano-Turanian Region flora and changing altitude and climate values. The flora is also composed of degraded oak, high mountain steppes and seasonal vegetation. The red pine forests are situated on the northern side of the mountain. On the southern mountain slopes, there are vineyards and orchards. The mountain contains 36 plant species endemic to the country. Three of them are found only at Mount Ahır.

The mountain area is habitat for 13 butterfly species, including Polyommatus theresiae, a species found in the Mediterranean region.

See also
Yedikuyular Ski Resort

References

Mountains of Turkey
Taurus Mountains
Landforms of Kahramanmaraş Province
Ski areas and resorts in Turkey
Two-thousanders of Turkey